The Parishes of Jersey football team is a representative team of Jersey in international football. As opposed to the Jersey official football team, which is administered by the Jersey Football Association and is seen as part of the English FA, the Parishes of Jersey team is independent and operates as a member of the WUFA. As it is not a member of UEFA or FIFA, it cannot compete in the FIFA World Cup or UEFA European Championship. Parishes of Jersey were members of CONIFA between 2018 and 2021 and had qualified for the 2020 CONIFA World Football Cup before the tournament was cancelled due to COVID-19.

History
The Parishes of Jersey team was formed in summer 2018 by former Jersey international James Scott, after the Jersey Football Association's unsuccessful application to join UEFA. In June 2018, ConIFA general secretary Sascha Düerkop offered an invitation to Jersey to join the organization, and in September, the team was officially accepted as a member after signing a memorandum of understanding with the JFA.

While it was originally thought that Parishes of Jersey would make its international debut in a 2019 CONIFA European Football Cup qualification tournament in November, it was announced a week later that their first international fixture would be a home tie against fellow newcomers Yorkshire on 21 October. On 3 October, Jack Boyle was announced as the first captain of the team.

Coverage of the first match was provided by BBC Radio Jersey. Captain Jack Boyle scored the first ever goal for the team during the game. On 7 July, 2020, Parishes of Jersey were announced as a founding member of the World Unity Football Alliance. On 2 February, 2021, Parishes of Jersey announced they had left CONIFA by an open letter to their players after being left disappointed by the organisation, feeling they'd been omitted from the 2021 CONIFA European Football Cup as punishment for joining the World Unity Football Alliance the previous summer.

Fixtures & Results

2018

2019

2021

Selected International Opponents

Squad
The following players were called up to the squad for the 2019 Atlantic Heritage Cup in June 2019.

Caps and goals correct as of 2 June 2019 after the game against .

Recent call-ups
The following players have been called up in the past twelve months or withdrew from the squad due to injury or suspension.

Staff

See also
Jersey official football team

References

External links
Parishes of Jersey on Twitter

CONIFA member associations
European national and official selection-teams not affiliated to FIFA
Football
Football in Jersey